Roman Hamrlík (born April 12, 1974) is a Czech former professional ice hockey defenceman who played 20 seasons in the National Hockey League (NHL). He was originally selected first overall in the 1992 NHL Entry Draft by the Tampa Bay Lightning, the first-ever selection by the expansion franchise, going on to begin his career with the team before later playing for the Edmonton Oilers, New York Islanders, Calgary Flames, Montreal Canadiens, Washington Capitals and New York Rangers. In total, he played 1,395 games during his NHL career and participated in three NHL All-Star Games, in 1996, 1999 and 2003.

Hamrlík also represented the Czech Republic on numerous occasions at the international level, including at the 1998 Winter Olympics, where he was part of the gold medal-winning Czech team. He also played in the 2002 Winter Olympics, as well as two Ice Hockey World Championships, in 1994 and 2004, and two World Cup of Hockey tournaments, in 1996 and 2004 World Cup of Hockey.

Playing career 
Drafted first overall by the Tampa Bay Lightning in the 1992 NHL Entry Draft from ZPS Zlín, Hamrlík played as a defenceman who typically took on an offensive role for his team, especially on the powerplay. His offensive prowess earned him the role of the "powerplay quarterback," as he often lead the offense in a powerplay.

After his draft, Hamrlík would make the immediate leap to North America to play for the Lightning in the 1992–93 season. In 1995–96, he posted career-highs in goals (16), assists (49) and points (65). After five-and-a-half seasons with the organization, Hamrlík was traded to the Edmonton Oilers midway through the 1997–98 season.

Hamrlík then signed as a free agent with the New York Islanders in the summer of 2000, where during the 2000–01 season, he would match his career-high in goals with 16.

Hamrlík signed as an unrestricted free agent with the Calgary Flames on August 12, 2005, to a two-year, $7 million contract. In 2006–07, he posted a career-high in plus-minus with +22. On July 2, 2007, again as a free agent, Hamrlík signed a four-year, $22 million contract with the Montreal Canadiens.

After four productive seasons with Montreal, Hamrlík signed as a free agent on a two-year, $7 million contract with the Washington Capitals on July 1, 2011. In his second season with Washington during the lockout-shortened 2012–13 season, Hamrlik was limited to just four games as a reserve defenceman before he was ultimately placed on waivers by the team on March 5, 2013. He was claimed by the New York Rangers on March 6, 2013.

Hamrlík announced his retirement from professional hockey on October 21, 2013.

Hamrlík was inducted into the Czech Ice Hockey Hall of Fame on January 22, 2019.

Personal life 
Hamrlík has an older brother, Martin Hamrlík, who was drafted by the Hartford Whalers in 1991, but never played in the NHL. Martin Hamrlík played principally for PSG Zlín, retiring in 2013.

Hamrlík and his wife Cynthia have a son and daughter together.

Career statistics

Regular season and playoffs

International

Awards 
 NHL All-Star Game – 1996, 1999, 2003

See also 
List of NHL players with 1000 games played

References

External links 

1974 births
Atlanta Knights players
Calgary Flames players
Czech ice hockey defencemen
Edmonton Oilers players
Ice hockey players at the 1998 Winter Olympics
Ice hockey players at the 2002 Winter Olympics
Living people
Montreal Canadiens players
National Hockey League All-Stars
National Hockey League first-overall draft picks
National Hockey League first-round draft picks
New York Islanders players
New York Rangers players
Olympic gold medalists for the Czech Republic
Olympic ice hockey players of the Czech Republic
Sportspeople from Zlín
Tampa Bay Lightning draft picks
Tampa Bay Lightning players
Washington Capitals players
PSG Berani Zlín players
Olympic medalists in ice hockey
Medalists at the 1998 Winter Olympics
Czech expatriate ice hockey players in the United States
Czech expatriate ice hockey players in Canada
Czechoslovak ice hockey defencemen